The 2021 Knowsley Metropolitan Borough Council election took place on 6 May 2021 to elect members of Knowsley Metropolitan Borough Council in England. This was on the same day as other local elections. One-third of the seats were up for election.

Results

Ward results

Cherryfield

Halewood North

Halewood South

Northwood

Page Moss

Prescot North

Prescot South

Roby

Shevington

St Gabriels

St Michaels

Stockbridge

Swanside

Whiston and Cronton

Whitefield

References 

Knowsley
Council elections in the Metropolitan Borough of Knowsley